East Asian Jewish communities have existed for centuries. Even as the majority of the Jewish people settled in the Holy Land, Europe, and America, some traveled East Asia and settled. Today, due to the increasing ease and decreasing price of communications and transportation, as well as other effects of globalization, the Jewish communities in China, Japan, and other places continue to grow.

China

Jewish settlers are documented in China as early as the 7th or 8th century CE, but they may have arrived during the middle of the Han Dynasty, or even as early as 231 BCE. Relatively isolated communities developed from the Tang and Song Dynasties (7th to 12th centuries CE) to the Qing Dynasty (19th century), the Kaifeng Jews comprised the most notable of these communities (in a restricted sense, the term "Chinese Jews" is often used in reference to these communities). By the time of the establishment of the People's Republic of China in 1949, few if any native Chinese Jews were known to have maintained the practice of their religion and culture. In the late 20th and early 21st centuries, however, some international Jewish groups have helped Chinese Jews rediscover their heritage.

In the 19th and early 20th centuries, Jewish immigrants from around the world arrived in China with Western commercial influences, particularly in the commercial centers of Hong Kong, which was for a time a British colony, Shanghai (the International Settlement and French Concession), and Harbin (the Trans-Siberian Railway). In the first half of the 20th century, thousands of Jewish refugees escaping from the 1917 Russian Revolution and the Holocaust in Europe arrived in China. However a majority of them immigrated to Israel and various western countries after the communist takeover in 1949.

Jews may be considered one of the officially undistinguished ethnic groups in China. The current number of Jews residing in the country is 2,000.

Korea

The Jewish presence in South Korea effectively began with the outbreak of the Korean War in 1950. At this time a large number of Jewish soldiers, including the chaplain Chaim Potok, came to the Korean Peninsula. Today the Jewish community is very small and limited to the Seoul metropolitan area. There have been very few Korean converts to Judaism. In North Korea however, the presence of a Jewish community remains unknown.

Japan

The first confirmed contacts between the Japanese and people of Jewish ancestry began during the Age of Discovery (16th century) with the arrival of European travelers and merchants (primarily the Portuguese and Dutch). However, it wasn't until 1853, with the arrival of Commodore Matthew Perry following the Convention of Kanagawa ending Japan's "closed-door" foreign policy that Jewish families began to settle in Japan. The first recorded Jewish settlers arrived at Yokohama in 1861 establishing a diverse community consisting of 50 families (from various Western countries) as well as the building of the first synagogue in Japan. By 1957 there were only 15 Jewish families left in Yokohama.  

During World War II, Japan was regarded as a safe refuge from the Holocaust, despite being a part of the Axis and an ally of Germany. During World War II, Jews trying to escape Poland could not pass the blockades near the Soviet Union and the Mediterranean Sea and were forced to go through the neutral country of Lithuania (which was occupied by belligerents in June 1940, starting with the Soviet Union, then Germany, and then the Soviet Union again).

Presently, there are several hundred Jewish families living in Tokyo, and a small number of Jewish families in Kobe and Yokohama.A small number of Jewish expatriates of other countries live throughout Japan, temporarily, for business, research, a gap year, or a variety of other purposes. There are very rarely Jewish members of the United States armed forces serving on Okinawa and in the other American military bases throughout Japan.

See also
Kaifeng Jews 
Shanghai Ghetto
History of Jews in Kobe
Jewish settlement in Imperial Japan
Fugu Plan
History of the Jews in China
History of the Jews in Japan
Jewish Autonomous Oblast
List of Asian Jews

References